Rimsky-Korsakov Archipelago is a group of six small islands and few kekurs (rocky islets) in Peter the Great Gulf of Sea of Japan under administration of Khasansky District.

The archipelago is uninhabited and has area of approximately 6 square kilometres. The largest island is Bolshoy Pelis (4 km²).

Islands were discovered for Europeans by French whalers in 1851 and named Iles pelée. Later the archipelago was named after commander of schooner Vostok Voin Rimsky-Korsakov.

Notes

Archipelagoes of the Pacific Ocean
Islands of the Sea of Japan
Islands of Primorsky Krai
Uninhabited islands of Russia
Archipelagoes of Russia
Nikolai Rimsky-Korsakov